Will Seymour Monroe (1863 Hunlock, Pennsylvania – 1939) was a United States educator.

Biography
He attended Stanford University, and studied at the Jena, Paris, and Leipzig universities, becoming in 1896 professor of psychology at the Massachusetts Normal School, Westfield. After 1909, he taught at the New Jersey State Normal School, Montclair. He lectured before many universities in the United States and abroad, and was delegate to many congresses and expositions.

Works
 Poets and Poetry of the Wyoming Valley
 Educational Labors of Henry Barnard
 Comenius and the Beginnings of Educational Reform
 Turkey and the Turks
 In Viking Land; Norway: Its Peoples, Fjords and its Fjelds
 The Spell of Sicily, the Garden of the Mediterranean
 Bohemia and the Czechs
 Bulgaria and her People

Notes

References

Portrait and information on 1921 visit to Shanghai, China

External links
Photographs at cdi.uvm.edu

1863 births
1939 deaths
American educators
Stanford University alumni
University of Jena alumni
Leipzig University alumni